Alexander Valerievich Lapshin (born 4 February 1976) is a well known Russian-Israeli travel-blogger and journalist, who has visited more than 146 countries. Nevertheless, the world media began to widely cover the activities of Lapshin when, in 2016, he was arrested in Minsk at the request of the Azerbaijani authorities and extradited to Baku due to a tourist visit to Nagorno-Karabakh. This caused tension in relations between Armenia and Belarus, and also became the topic of the foreign policy agenda in Israel and Russia. Russian Foreign Minister Sergey Lavrov said that Russia is categorically against the extradition of the blogger to Azerbaijan, as well as against the criminalization of visits by Russians to certain regions of the world. Israel also protested against the extradition. As a result, five states were involved in an international scandal concerning the blogger. On May 20, 2021, the European Court of Human Rights in Strasbourg ruled on the blogger's complaint against the Republic of Azerbaijan, finding the country's authorities responsible for the illegal arrest, torture and attempted murder against Lapshin.

Biography 
Alexander Lapshin was born in 1976 in Sverdlovsk (now Yekaterinburg), to a Russian father and Jewish mother. At the age of 13, he emigrated to Israel with his family. After graduating from the University of Haifa, he served three years with the Israel Defense Forces, both in the Gaza Strip and on the Lebanese-Israeli border. For about a year, he studied in the United States. Between 2003 and 2008, he lived in Moscow and was engaged in commercial real estate and the Forex market. After the financial crisis of 2008, he returned to Israel. Until 2016, he lived on the Rosh HaNikra kibbutz in Israel, near the border with Lebanon, working as a remote editor of Russian travel Internet resources.

Arrest 
On December 15, 2016, Lapshin was arrested in Minsk at the request of Azerbaijan, which had put him on a “black list” for visiting the Nagorno Karabakh Republic without approval from Baku. Lapshin visited Nagorno-Karabakh twice, in 2011 and 2012, resulting in the "blacklisting" by Azerbaijan, i.e. he was prohibited from visiting Azerbaijan. Nevertheless, Alexander Lapshin was able to visit Baku in June 2016, having entered Azerbaijan with his Ukrainian passport, which used the spelling “Olexander” instead of “Alexander” (due to the Ukrainian transliteration).

The General Prosecutor's Office of Belarus decided to satisfy the request by Azerbaijan and extradited Lapshin to Azerbaijan on 7 February 7, 2017 on President Ilham Aliyev's personal jet. Diplomats of both Russia and Israel actively attempted to prevent his extradition to Azerbaijan. The Republic of Armenia actively protested his extradition as well. As a result, diplomats and officials of five countries were involved in the case. The representative of the US State Department John Kirby spoke about the Lapshin case. In Yerevan, future Armenian Prime Minister Nikol Pashinyan organized protests in front of the Belarusian embassy after Lapshin was extradited from Minsk to Baku. Later, Lapshin personally thanked Pashinyan for this support. The protest in connection with the extradition of Lapshin was also announced by the OSCE.

Numerous Russian politicians spoke out against Lapshin’s extradition to Azerbaijan, such as Tatyana Moskalkova, Commissioner for Human Rights in the Russian Federation, who called the incident a gross violation of the rights of journalists. The leader of the LDPR faction Vladimir Zhirinovsky condemned Lukashenko's decision to extradite a Russian citizen to Azerbaijan, saying that the journalist has the right to go wherever he wishes to fulfill his professional duty.

Some politicians and public figures of Turkey spoke out against Lapshin’s extradition, such as the deputy of the Turkish Mejlis and the founder of the Green Party Ufuk Uras and human rights activist Shanar Yurdatapan.

A number of Czech politicians condemned Lapshin’s extradition, primarily the Czech Republic’s deputy in the European Parliament, Jaromír Štětina, the Czech ambassador to Armenia Petr Mikiska.

Also, the European MPs Frank Engel (Luxembourg) and Eleni Thehouse (Cyprus) joined the call to immediately release the blogger.

Shortly before Lapshin’s arrest, Alexander Lukashenko paid a visit to Baku in late November 2016, during which the Belarusian president received the medal after Heydar Aliyev (the country's highest award), from the hands of Ilham Aliyev, kissed it and promised to “work it out”.

A court in Baku sentenced Lapshin to three years in prison. Three months after that, on 11 September 2017, Ilham Aliyev signed a decree to pardon Alexander Lapshin, after which he was able to fly from Baku to Tel Aviv.

Attempted murder 
On the night of September 11, 2017, Lapshin was attacked in a solitary confinement cell of a Baku pre-trial detention center. In the morning of September 11, Ali Hasanov, a personal adviser to the president, made a statement that Lapshin had attempted suicide, but that the prison guards managed to save his life. It was also stated that, in connection with this incident, it was decided to pardon him by presidential decree. Lapshin spent 3 days in the intensive care unit of a Baku hospital and then was deported to Israel. After arriving in Israel, Lapshin made a statement to the press that he had not committed suicide and that he had been attacked in Baku with the aim of murder. Medical examinations conducted in Israel confirmed the blogger’s version of the attempted murder, which contradicted the official position of the Baku authorities. Independent experts in Russia and the Netherlands also confirmed the assassination version, which became the basis for filing a complaint against Azerbaijan to the European Court of Human Rights in Strasbourg.

The circumstances of the arrest and pardon 
The arrest and extradition of Lapshin from Belarus to Azerbaijan remains a hot topic for the media and politicians in a numerous countries. Lapshin himself repeatedly published documents indicating that the authorities of Belarus arrested him illegally, fabricating non-existent charges and acting in violation of its own legislation. The authorities of Belarus kept Lapshin in the same cell with Belarusian opposition leader and activist Ales Yurkoit, as well as with Japanese artist Daichi Yoshida. Lapshin repeatedly gave interviews on the topic of bullying and lawlessness happening in Belarusian prisons. As for Azerbaijan, Lapshin claimed that he was kept  next to the convicted Azerbaijani general Arif Chovdarov and was familiar with the Baku blogger Mehman Galandarov, also a prisoner who later has died in a prison cell under unclear circumstances.

The President of Belarus, Alexander Lukashenko, stated that Lapshin was arrested in Minsk at the request of Interpol, while Interpol reported that the blogger’s name was never on the wanted list.

The extradition of Lapshin from Azerbaijan to Israel as a result of a pardon given by Azerbaijani President Ilham Aliyev also passed with a scandal. The Azerbaijani authorities claimed that they had long ago agreed to extradite him to Israel, but for some reason the Israeli side did not agree on the necessary procedure and as a result, Lapshin attempted suicide, which Lapshin subsequently denied and called the attempted murder. In addition, the blogger arrested as a Russian citizen was extradited to Israel as an Israeli citizen. The contradictions regarding whether Lapshin pleaded guilty to the acts incriminated to him (visiting Nagorno-Karabakh without the consent of Azerbaijan) are noteworthy, since the Azerbaijani media claim that Lapshin pleaded guilty, while the Russian media claim that he did not plead.

The pardon of the blogger by the President of Azerbaijan, Ilham Aliyev, was published on the official website of the head of state on September 11, 2017 at 10:35 in the morning, less than two hours after Lapshin’s admission to the Baku hospital (according to the Azerbaijani authorities, the blogger attempted suicide, according to Lapshin himself on he was attacked), which, according to some analysts, indicates that the incident could be related to the internal political struggle within Azerbaijan and attempts to discredit the current government.

After his release, Lapshin has been actively involved in the struggle for human rights; he has repeatedly spoken in organizations such as the UN, PACE, OSCE, and at various international forums and conferences. Also in Washington, the blogger met with Armenian President Armen Sargsyan and congressmen Brad Sherman and David Price, whom he acquainted with the violation of human rights in Azerbaijan.

Third countries involvement 
The authorities of the Republic of Azerbaijan issued an arrest warrant against Lapshin to at least 13 countries, but were refused all, except of Belarus. A complete list of these countries has not been announced anywhere by Azerbaijan, however, some sources indicate one of the countries – Ukraine, that officially refused to cooperate in a criminal prosecution of a blogger. In June 2019, Lapshin has accused the Georgian authorities of illegally transferring his personal information to the Azerbaijani authorities. In addition, Lapshin stated that he had documents indicating the transfer by the Georgian authorities of information about hundreds of tourists and Armenian citizens crossing the Georgian-Armenian border.

New criminal prosecution of Lapshin by Azerbaijan 
In February 2019, it became known about the re-initiation of criminal proceedings by the General Prosecutor of Azerbaijan against the blogger and journalist Alexander Lapshin. This time, the Baku authorities accused the journalist on the articles "Discrediting or humiliating the honor and dignity of the President of the Republic of Azerbaijan" and "Open calls against the Government of Azerbaijan". It is noteworthy that official Baku has refused to comment on this issue, while the Israeli Foreign Ministry not only made an official statement about the new persecution of its citizen, but also emphasized in its statement that Lapshin should be careful when leaving Israel, thereby emphasizing his disagreement with the actions of Azerbaijan. A number of analysts attribute Israel’s similar steps to certain irritation regarding Baku’s actions against a blogger and journalist who is a citizen of the Jewish state.

Attempted kidnapping of Lapshin in Latvia 
On December 15, 2019, the information was published about an attempt to kidnap a blogger during his stay in Riga (Latvia). According to the Israel and Russian media reports, the order to abduct Lapshin came personally from the General Ali Nagiyev, a head of the  special services of Azerbaijan and with the participation of criminal authorities controlled by him in the Azerbaijani diaspora of Latvia. Based on information in the media, the kidnapping attempt was supposed to take place at the Mercury Riga hotel, where Lapshin supposed to participate at a tourism forum. While the Azerbaijani government has refused to comment on this incident, the Azerbaijani mass media and Azeri based experts deny the Israeli and Russian versions. Thanks to the actions of local Latvian law enforcement authorities, Lapshin was subsequently able to return to Israel.

Lapshin's appeal to the ECHR 
At the beginning of 2018, Alexander Lapshin filed a lawsuit against Azerbaijan in the European Court of Human Rights (EHCR), in which he accused Azerbaijan of attempted murder, torture, illegal imprisonment. His lawyer is Karina Moskalenko, who also represents Alexey Navalny in a complaint against the Russian Federation. On December 15, 2018, the European Court notified Lapshin’s lawyers that he had begun communication with the Azerbaijani authorities, having decided that the evidence presented about the attempted murder in a Baku prison, the infliction of grievous bodily harm and torture was enough to initiate proceedings against Azerbaijan. On May 20, 2021, the European Court of Human Rights in Strasbourg ruled on the blogger's complaint against the Republic of Azerbaijan, finding the country's authorities responsible for the illegal arrest, torture and attempted murder against Lapshin.

Resolution of the UN Human Rights Committee on the case of Lapshin 

On September 7, 2022, the UN Human Rights Committee adopted a resolution recognizing the Belarusian authorities as guilty of the legal arrest and subsequent extradition to Azerbaijan of Alexander Lapshin. The resolution emphasizes that visiting Nagorno-Karabakh as a journalist cannot be considered a criminal offense, and also states that the extradition to Azerbaijan potentially threatened the journalist's life and should not have taken place.

Visit to Saudi Arabia 

On February 2, 2020 Lapshin paid a visit to the Kingdom of Saudi Arabia to be the first Israeli citizen to visit the kingdom officially since 1948, when the state of Israel was created. The Interior Ministry of Israel announced on January 26, 2020 that it will now permit Israelis to visit Saudi Arabia, for the first time in Israel’s history. The new rules will allow travel to Saudi Arabia for the Islamic pilgrimages known as the Hajj and the Umrah, or for business trips of up to 90 days.

References

External links 
 

1976 births
Living people
Israeli bloggers
Russian bloggers
Israeli soldiers
Israeli photographers
Russian emigrants to Israel
Israeli people of Russian-Jewish descent
Israeli people of Ukrainian-Jewish descent
Human rights abuses in Azerbaijan
European Court of Human Rights cases involving Azerbaijan